Bad Girls from Valley High  is a 2005 American direct-to-video teen comedy film starring Julie Benz, Monica Keena, Nicole Bilderback, Jonathan Brandis, Janet Leigh, Christopher Lloyd and Suzanna Urszuly. The film marked the final film roles of Leigh and Brandis.

Plot
Danielle (Julie Benz), Tiffany (Nicole Bilderback) and Brooke (Monica Keena) are the three richest, most popular girls in their high school, nicknamed "The Huns" due to the exclusive housing estate they live in, Hundred Pines. Danielle and Tiffany are cruel and spiteful, whereas Brooke is kind but is easily intimidated and manipulated by Danielle and Tiffany. While the leader Danielle is used to getting what she wants, she is unable to attract lonesome ex-jock Drew (Jonathan Brandis) due to his mourning over the death of his girlfriend Charity Chase (Tanja Reichert). Although Charity was believed to have committed suicide, this wasn't the case as Danielle, Tiffany and Brooke lured Charity to a cliff, hoping to terrorize her into breaking up with Drew, but ended up killing her by accident.

A year to the day of Charity's death, Romanian foreign exchange student Katarina (Suzanna Urszuly) arrives during the class of clumsy Media Arts Professor Mr. Chauncey (Christopher Lloyd). Katarina and Drew immediately become friends. Jealous from this, Danielle tries to do everything in her power to stop this friendship developing into love. In an attempt to get close to Drew, Danielle works at the elderly home where Drew is also working. While there, she is assigned to look after an old lady (Janet Leigh) whom she believes is catatonic. Danielle, Tiffany and Brooke use this opportunity to raid the old lady's cupboard and eat her box of chocolates.

In the following two weeks, the three girls begin to notice that something strange is happening to them, they are receiving back pains and their hair is turning gray - to their horror they discover that they are aging at a rapid speed. They believe this has something to do with Katarina whom they now think is in fact Charity's ghost coming back to seek revenge. The three decide the only way to regain their youth is to kill Drew to let his spirit be with Charity. On the night of Danielle's 18th birthday party, the three lure Drew to the same gorge where Charity died and attempt to shoot him. Katarina shows up and says she is not Charity's ghost. Danielle briefly ponders this but decides to shoot them both anyway. However, Brooke finally stands up for herself and says that they have gone too far. She tries to prevent Danielle from pulling the trigger to which Drew disarms her due to Danielle being frail and weak and also distracted by a party guest dressed in a clown suit from her party (who is secretly Chauncey) who she shoots, and both Tiffany and Danielle are overcome from exhaustion.

Now in the old age home, Tiffany is hooked on a life support machine and Danielle is barely alive. At that moment, Mrs. Witt (the old woman who Danielle was meant to be caring for) shows up and reveals that she was Charity's grandmother. Also, while she had been briefly unable to speak due to a stroke, she had very good hearing and sight and overheard Danielle bragging about Charity's murder. Witt then reveals she poisoned the chocolate box (knowing that the girls would eat it) with an aging chemical (thanks to her late roommate's husband that worked with biological warfare technology); Brooke wasn't dying as she demonstrated self-control while Danielle and Tiffany had eaten most of the poisoned chocolate. Tiffany presumably dies during Witt's revelation, and Danielle flips the bird to Witt in response and then dies shortly afterwards.

At Danielle and Tiffany's funeral, everyone is in attendance, including Drew and Katarina (now an official couple) attends. Brooke is also in attendance after a plastic surgeon's operation to try and improve her appearance, but only so much could be done and she still looks fifty years old. Chauncey forgives her as he knew she wasn't as cruel as Danielle and Tiffany, and she regrets what she has done. Danielle and Tiffany are then revealed to be in a luxurious room with their youth restored and are convinced that they are in heaven. But it is revealed that they are actually in hell as they are forced to forever endure the company of their school's most annoying dork, Jonathan Wharton (Aaron Paul), who is completely devoted to Danielle's every move. As such, he reveals that he committed suicide just to be with her forever and briefly morphs into the devil, to her and Tiffany's horror.

Cast
Julie Benz as Danielle
Monica Keena as Brooke
Nicole Bilderback as Tiffany
Jonathan Brandis as Drew
Aaron Paul as Jonathan Wharton
Suzanna Urszuly as Katarina
Chris D'Elia as Gavin
Janet Leigh as Edwina Witt
Christopher Lloyd as Mr. Chauncey

Production
Originally titled A Fate Totally Worse than Death, the screenplay was based on the novel of the same name. The film was shot on location in Vancouver, British Columbia. Several scenes were filmed at the Cleveland Dam.

External links 
 
 
 

American direct-to-video films
2005 direct-to-video films
2005 comedy films
2005 independent films
American comedy films
Direct-to-video comedy films
2000s English-language films
Films shot in Vancouver
Universal Pictures direct-to-video films
American independent films
2000s American films